Amerila makadara is a moth of the subfamily Arctiinae. It was described by Christoph L. Häuser and Michael Boppré in 1997. It is found in the Democratic Republic of the Congo, Kenya, Eswatini and Zimbabwe.

References

 , 2009: Reviewing the African tiger-moth genera: 1. A new genus, two new subgenera and a species list from the expedition to Malawi by V. Kovtunovich & P. Ustjuzhanin in 2008-2009, with further taxonomic notes on South African Arctiinae. Atalanta 40 (1-2): 285-301.
 , 1997: A revision of the Afrotropical taxa of the genus Amerila Walker (Lepidoptera, Arctiidae). Systematic Entomology 22 (1): 1-44.

Moths described in 1997
Amerilini
Moths of Africa